Thinali is a former municipality on the island of Corfu, Ionian Islands, Greece. Since the 2019 local government reform it is part of the municipality North Corfu, of which it is a municipal unit. It is located in the northernmost part of the island of Corfu, in the middle of the north coast. With its 77.899 km², it was the largest municipality on the island.  Its population was 5,226 at the 2011 census. The seat of the municipality was the town of Acharavi (pop. 1,013).  Its largest other towns are Nymfes (pop. 612) and Epískepsi (332).  It is located northwest of the city of Corfu. Last mayor of Thinali was Varelis Spiridon from village Lafki.

Subdivisions
The municipal unit Thinali is subdivided into the following communities (constituent villages in brackets):
Nymfes (Nymfes, Platonas)
Agios Panteleimonas (Agios Panteleimonas, Acharavi, Vrachleri, Lazaratika, Priftiatika, Strongyli, Fourni)
Episkepsi (Episkepsi, Agios Stefanos)
Klimatia (Klimatia, Episkopi, Kyprianades)
Lafki (Lafki, Agios Martinos, Psachnia, Trimodi)
Loutses (Loutses, Anapaftiria, Apraos, Magarika)
Xanthates
Peritheia (Peritheia, Agios Ilias, Vathy, Vasilika, Vouni, Karniaris, Krinia, Pelekito, Perouli, Pithos, Riliatika)
Petaleia (Petaleia, Droseri, Eriva, Perama, Strinyla)
Sfakera (Sfakera, Roda)

Population

Geography

The municipal unit has a varied geography: the area near the sea is flat, and the southern part is mountainous. In the Pantokrator mountains, in the southeast, there are several picturesque mountain villages including Petaleia, Ano Peritheia and Lafki. The touristic beach centre of Roda is on the north coast. At the western edge of the municipality is the Antinioti Lagoon.

Economy 

Until recently, the economy of Thinali was mainly agricultural. A large part of the total production of olives and kumquats of Corfu is grown in Thinali. Other products includes wine, walnuts and citrus. Especially on the coast tourism has gained importance in recent years.

References

External links
Official website 
Thinali on GTP Travel Pages

 
Populated places in Corfu (regional unit)